Joseph Elijah Armstrong (November 9, 1866 – January 31, 1931) was a Canadian politician.

Born in York County, Canada West, Armstrong was educated in National School of Elocution and Oratory in Philadelphia, PA. An oil producer, a manufacturer and farmer, he first ran unsuccessfully as the Protestant Protective Association candidate for the House of Commons of Canada in the electoral district of Lambton East in the 1896 federal election. Switching to the Conservative Party, he was elected in a 1904 by-election. He served from 1904 to 1921 and from 1925 to 1926.

References
 
 The Canadian Parliament; biographical sketches and photo-engravures of the senators and members of the House of Commons of Canada. Being the tenth Parliament, elected November 3, 1904

1866 births
1931 deaths
Conservative Party of Canada (1867–1942) MPs
Members of the House of Commons of Canada from Ontario
People from the Regional Municipality of York
Protestant Protective Association politicians
Candidates in the 1896 Canadian federal election